Auxey-Duresses is a commune in the Côte-d'Or department in the Bourgogne-Franche-Comté region of eastern France.

The inhabitants of the commune are known as Alcéens or Alcéennes.

Geography
Auxey-Duresses is a wine-growing commune some 10 km south-west of Beaune and 11 km north of Chagny. Access to the commune is by the D973 road from Pommard in the north-east which passes through the length of the commune and the village and continues south-west to La Rochepot. The D17E comes from Saint-Romain in the west and passes through the village continuing east to Meursault. Apart from the village there are the hamlets of Melin in the south-west and Petit-Auxey west of the village. The north and south of the commune are rugged and heavily forested with the valley in the centre and west farmland.

The Ruisseau des Cloux flows from the south-west through the centre of the commune from west to east where it continues to join the river Dheune near Merceuil.

History
The Auxey valley was one of the first places where grapevines were planted in Burgundy during the 2nd century BC. when Auxey-le-Petit, which was dependent on Auxey-Duresses, was a high place of Druid worship. On Mount Mélian the remains of a large prehistoric enclosure can be found which was at that time occupied by the Gauls and the Romans. During the Gallo-Roman period the town grew and became known by the Latin name Alcius.

After the barbarian invasions of the 5th century AD the commune reached new heights thanks to the monks of the Abbey of Saint-Symphorien at Autun who built a church at Auxey-le-Petit in 696. It was rebuilt in the 10th century by monks from the Cluny Abbey and it had a large vineyard in the village. The bell tower and the gate are Romanesque and date from the 12th century. These monks also left the "Moines Mill". At that time there were many mills in the valley and the hamlet of Melin, another dependency of the commune, inherited the name.

At the site of the medieval castle there is now the Church of Saint-Martin-Duresses Auxey whose steeple is made from Tuff. Inside there are some paintings, including a triptych relating the life of Mary. The present chateau belonged to the Marquis de MacMahon, one of whose descendants became Marshal of France and Duke of Magenta.

Heraldry

Administration
List of Successive Mayors

Mayors from 1934

Demography
In 2017 the commune had 304 inhabitants.

Wine

Auxey-Duresses is one of the wine communes of the Côte de Beaune with 80 hectares of red wines (including 27 hectares in 1st Vintage) and 35.60 hectares of white wines (including 1.35 hectare in 1st Vintage).

Culture and heritage

Civil heritage
The commune has a number of buildings and structures that are registered as historical monuments:
A Lavoir (Public laundry) at Petit-Auxey (19th century)
A Lavoir (Public laundry) at Meulin (1867)
A Lavoir (Public laundry) at an unnamed place (19th century)
A Lavoir (Public laundry) (19th century)

Religious heritage

The commune has several religious buildings and structures that are registered as historical monuments:
The Church of Petit-Auxey (12th century)
The Church of Saint-Martin (14th century). The Church contains several items that are registered as historical objects:
A Painting: Saint Theresa of Avila and Saint John of the Cross (17th century)
A Painting: Fainting of Saint Theresa of Avila (17th century)
A Painting: Saint Catherine of Sienna (17th century)
A Painting: Saint Hyacinthe (17th century)
A Painting: The dead Christ (17th century)
A Retable (Triptych) depicting the life of the Virgin (16th century)
A Cemetery Cross
The Cemetery (15th century)

See also
French wine
Communes of the Côte-d'Or department

Bibliography
Pierre Poupon, Pierre Forgeot, Paul Devaux, and Louis Régis Affre, The Wines of Burgundy, 9th edition, Presses universitaires de France, 1980, 351 pages

References

External links
Auxey-Duresses on Géoportail, National Geographic Institute (IGN) website 
Auxey on the 1750 Cassini Map

Communes of Côte-d'Or